Legends (aka VH1's Legends) is a music biography television series on VH1. Originally sponsored by AT&T Corporation, this series documents those artists (living or dead) who have made a significant contribution to music history to be profiled on the show (as opposed to VH1's companion series, Behind The Music, which profiles mostly moderately significant artists).

The show goes in-depth into the entire career of the artist(s), with each episode containing rare concert and music video footage.

The initial episodes were narrated by Kris Kristofferson, however other narrators have included Sheryl Crow, Steven Tyler (of Aerosmith), Ossie Davis, Tate Donovan, Levon Helm, Henry Rollins, Charlie Rose, and James Justice. Recent episodes have been narrated by William Baldwin (husband of singer Chynna Phillips).

Tina Turner, Elton John, and John Lennon are the only artists so far to have been profiled on both Legends and Behind The Music.

References

External links

1990s American music television series
2000s American music television series
1995 American television series debuts
2001 American television series endings
Pop music television series
Rock music television series
VH1 music shows
1990s American documentary television series
2000s American documentary television series
Documentary television series about music